is a Japanese romantic comedy manga series by Keigo Maki. It was serialized on Kodansha's Magazine Pocket website and app from February 2019 to February 2023. The manga is licensed in North America by Kodansha USA. An anime television series adaptation produced by Doga Kobo aired from April to July 2022.

Premise
Izumi and Shikimori are a typical lovey-dovey high school couple, that is, until Izumi clumsily falls into trouble. Then Shikimori turns into a very cool heroine that makes everyone's heart throb.

Characters

  / 
 
 Izumi is Shikimori's boyfriend, described as "an upbeat and friendly kid. He's had terrible luck his entire life." He is rather unassertive, and hopes to become bolder, like Shikimori. He is a good student, having placed 5th in his class, and unlike Shikimori and Inuzuka, is a good cook. Although he is referred to as Yū in chapters 57 and 63, his full name is not revealed until near the end of the series.
  /  
 
 Shikimori is a sweet high school girl and Izumi's girlfriend. When Izumi gets in trouble, her persona changes to a cool heartthrob with sharp glaring eyes which everyone around her admires. She has excellent reflexes and regularly rescues Izumi from dangerous situations. Her friends call her  and Izumi's parents call her . She has light pink hair, and is a good student, having placed 11th in her class. She is athletic and excels especially when Izumi cheers her on. She is sensitive at times, especially when Izumi admires other girls and women shown in the media. She has a few weaknesses such as cooking and singing, although in a later chapter, it is revealed she has been taking cooking lessons along with Izumi's mother and has gotten better. She is left-handed.
 It is revealed Shikimori was really shy and timid before Izumi asked her out, and gained confidence once she was able to motivate Izumi to be a little more assertive.
 As with Izumi, Shikimori's full given name is not revealed until near the end of the series.
 
 
 Izumi's best friend, described as "true to himself", "likes to goof around, but he doesn't like slacking off." Shikimori's friends call him "Inu" (Dog). He has a part-time job.
 
 
She is one of Shikimori's best friends along with Hachimitsu. She's described as "sporty", "really outgoing, but she can get a little sappy". She is on the volleyball team with Kamiya.
 
 
She is one of Shikimori's best friends along with Nekozaki. She's described as having a lifeless expression, but is observant. She is petite compared to her friends, and prefers indoor activities like Izumi. She is fond of eating sweets.
  /  
 
 A star player on the volleyball team. She is tall and slim, and very popular at school. She and Izumi work on the library committee together. She likes Izumi but when she learns of Izumi and Shikimori's relationship, she feels pained and saddened she did not get to have a relationship with Izumi. Shikimori helps her reconcile her feelings.

Supporting characters

 
 
 Izumi's mother. She is as accident prone as Izumi.
 
 
 Izumi's father and Motoko's husband. He is fairly strong as he is able to carry Izumi and Shikimori on his back.
 
 
 Shikimori's mother. Like her daughter, she gives off a serious look.
 
 
 Shikimori's older brother.
 
 Isana is a young woman who works at the coffee shop which Inuzuka is also working part-time at. She hopes to someday own her own shop, and admires Inuzuka for his determination. 
 
 Saruogi is a classmate who joins Izumi and Shikimori's group as part of the school trip to Kyoto. He is painfully shy and slow to answer. Nekozaki cites a story where he gives up his seat on the train for an old woman but inadvertently gets off a stop too early and ends up being late. After Izumi talks with him, Saruogi plans on being a little more assertive.

Media

Manga
Written and illustrated by Keigo Maki, Shikimori's Not Just a Cutie was serialized in Kodansha's Magazine Pocket website and app from February 2, 2019, to February 18, 2023. Eighteen tankōbon volumes have been published as of February 2023. In March 2020, Kodansha USA announced that they had licensed the series for print release in North America. The first English volume was released on October 27, 2020.

Volume list

Anime
In January 2021, the official Twitter account for the Magazine Pocket service announced that the series would receive an anime television series adaptation by Doga Kobo. Ryota Itoh directed the series, with Shōhei Yamanaka serving as assistant director, Yoshimi Narita overseeing the series' scripts, Ai Kikuchi designing the characters, and Hiroaki Tsutsumi composing the music. It aired from April 10 to July 10, 2022, on ABC and TV Asahi's  programming block. The opening theme song is "Honey Jet Coaster" (ハニージェットコースター) by Nasuo☆, while the ending theme song is "Route BLUE" by Yuki Nakashima. Crunchyroll licensed the series outside of Asia. Muse Communication licensed the series in South and Southeast Asia.

On April 11, 2022, Crunchyroll announced that the series would receive an English dub, which premiered on April 23.

Episode list

Reception
By February 2023, the manga had over 4.6 million copies in circulation.

Notes

References

Works cited
 "Ch." is shortened form for chapter and refers to a chapter number of the Shikimori's Not Just a Cutie manga.

General references

External links
 Shikimori's Not Just a Cutie manga profile at Magazine Pocket 
 Shikimori's Not Just a Cutie manga profile at Kodansha USA
 Shikimori's Not Just a Cutie anime official website 
 

2022 anime television series debuts
Anime postponed due to the COVID-19 pandemic
Anime series based on manga
Asahi Broadcasting Corporation original programming
Crunchyroll anime
Doga Kobo
Japanese webcomics
Kodansha manga
Muse Communication
Romantic comedy anime and manga
Shōnen manga
Webcomics in print